John English (born May 13, 1966) is a Canadian businessman and former professional ice hockey defenceman. He played in the National Hockey League for the Los Angeles Kings.

Biography
English was born in Toronto, Ontario. As a youth, he played in the 1979 Quebec International Pee-Wee Hockey Tournament with a minor ice hockey team from Toronto.

In three regular season games with the Los Angeles Kings, he recorded four points (one goal and three assists). By recording four points in the only three games he played in the NHL, English amusingly ranks as one of the highest points-per-game (ppg) players in NHL history, ranking in the Top 10 NHL all-time ppg statistics as of January 19th, 2020.

John English is currently a co-owner of Oliver's Coffee with locations around Muskoka, Ontario.

Career statistics

References

External links

1966 births
Living people
Canadian ice hockey defencemen
Cape Breton Oilers players
Flint Spirits players
Hamilton Steelhawks players
Los Angeles Kings draft picks
Los Angeles Kings players
New Haven Nighthawks players
Ottawa 67's players
Sault Ste. Marie Greyhounds players
Ice hockey people from Toronto